The Oldereid Hydroelectric Power Station ( or Oldereid kraftstasjon) is a hydroelectric power station in Misvær in Nordland county, Norway.

The plant has a single turbine with an installed capacity of 12 MW and an average annual production of about 60 GWh. The plant is owned by Salten Kraftsamband and it came into operation in 1953. The owner has obtained a license for further development, and water from two more lakes, Tindvatn and Lurfjellvatnet, will be transferred to the power plant. The Oldereid plant replaced what were originally six smaller river plants in the area.

Original installation
The municipalities of Bodø, Skjerstad, Fauske, Saltdal, and Sørfold started negotiations on building a conventional hydroelectric power station in 1945. The options were Daja in the Sulitjelma drainage system or the Oldereid drainage system, but the authorities were unable to reach an agreement, and so the Norwegian Water Resources and Energy Directorate had to make the choice. The decision was made in 1948 and the size of the facility was determined by the guidelines set up for electricity supply. Only Bodø and Skjerstad approved the decision, and Salten Kraftlag was founded in April 1949. Bodø became a shareholder with 90% ownership and Skjerstad with 10%.

Storage basins were created on the hill above the plant, Enghammeren, with the transition to turbine pipes located along the mountainside. The plant had a 14.0 MVA generator supplied by British Thomson-Houston. There were originally three outgoing power lines: two 20 kV lines to Skjerstad and one 60 kV line to Bodø.

New station
On 10 October 2016 Oldereid 2 was officially inaugurated after it went into production in 2015 following 18 months of construction. The new plant can produce 15 MW with a single Francis turbine and is expected to increase the annual production by 10 GWh to a projected 80 GWh annually.

See also

References

Hydroelectric power stations in Norway
Bodø
Energy infrastructure completed in 1953
Energy infrastructure completed in 2015
1953 establishments in Norway
2015 establishments in Norway